Son of the Hunchback (French: Le fils de Lagardère, Italian: Il Figlio di Lagardere) is a 1952 French-Italian historical adventure film directed by Fernando Cerchio and starring Rossano Brazzi, Milly Vitale and Gabrielle Dorziat. The film's sets were designed by the art director Giancarlo Bartolini Salimbeni. It is inspired by the 1858 historical novel Le Bossu by Paul Féval.

Cast
 Rossano Brazzi as Philippe de Lagardère  
 Milly Vitale as Olympe de Chaverny  
 Gabrielle Dorziat as Contessa Lagardere  
 Vittorio Sanipoli as Conte Zeno  
 Nerio Bernardi as Cocardasse  
 Nico Pepe as Helonin  
 Antoine Balpêtré as Pérolle  
 Simone Renant as Mathilde Pérolle  
 Beppe Tranico 
 Raymond Cordy as Passepoil  
 Olga Vittoria Gentilli 
 Franco Balducci 
 Cesare Bettarini 
 Arrigo Peri 
 Isa Querio

References

Bibliography
 Parish, Robert. Film Actors Guide. Scarecrow Press, 1977.

External links

1952 films
1950s historical adventure films
French historical adventure films
Italian historical adventure films
1950s Italian-language films
Films directed by Fernando Cerchio
Films set in the 17th century
Films based on French novels
French black-and-white films
1950s Italian films
1950s French films